Paul Klenerman (born 23 March 1963) is a British Olympic sabre fencer. He was born in London, England. Klenerman attended Clare College, Cambridge (1982; BA Medical Sciences), later fenced for Oxford University as a postgraduate.

Klenerman was the Great Britain Under-20 Fencing Champion. His fencing club is Salle Ganchev.

He is Jewish, and won the gold medal in sabre at the 1981 Maccabiah Games. In 1984, he won the sabre title at the British Fencing Championships at the age of 21. Klenerman also competed in the team sabre event at the 1984 Summer Olympics.

He is now a Professor of Immunology and medical researcher at Oxford  University.

References

External links
 

1963 births
Living people
British male fencers
Olympic fencers of Great Britain
Fencers at the 1984 Summer Olympics
Sportspeople from London
Jewish male sabre fencers
Jewish British sportspeople
Maccabiah Games medalists in fencing
Maccabiah Games gold medalists for Great Britain
Competitors at the 1981 Maccabiah Games
Alumni of the University of Oxford
Alumni of Clare Hall, Cambridge
Medical scholars of the University of Oxford
Fellows of Green Templeton College, Oxford
NIHR Senior Investigators